Mill Hall is a borough in Clinton County, Pennsylvania, United States. The population was 1,613 at the 2010 census.

History
The Nathan Harvey House was listed on the National Register of Historic Places in 1985.

Geography
Mill Hall is located in southern Clinton County at  (41.105359, -77.487804), on both sides of Fishing Creek between its exit from a water gap through Bald Eagle Mountain to the south and its mouth at Bald Eagle Creek to the north.

U.S. Route 220, a four-lane freeway, follows Fishing Creek through the Bald Eagle Mountain water gap and crosses the southeastern corner of Mill Hall, with access from Exit 109. Pennsylvania Route 64 passes through the center of Mill Hall, also leading south through the water gap and ending to the north at Pennsylvania Route 150, which follows the northern boundary of the borough. US 220 leads south  to Interstate 80 Exit 178.

Demographics

As of the census of 2000, there were 1,568 people, 662 households, and 456 families residing in the borough. The population density was 1,554.8 people per square mile (599.4/km²). There were 710 housing units at an average density of 704.0 per square mile (271.4/km²). The racial makeup of the borough was 99.17% White, 0.06% African American, 0.06% Native American, 0.26% Asian, 0.06% from other races, and 0.38% from two or more races. Hispanic or Latino of any race were 0.13% of the population.

There were 662 households, out of which 28.7% had children under the age of 18 living with them, 54.2% were married couples living together, 10.6% had a female householder with no husband present, and 31.0% were non-families. 26.4% of all households were made up of individuals, and 14.4% had someone living alone who was 65 years of age or older. The average household size was 2.37 and the average family size was 2.85.

In the borough the population was spread out, with 22.6% under the age of 18, 7.5% from 18 to 24, 27.2% from 25 to 44, 22.6% from 45 to 64, and 20.2% who were 65 years of age or older. The median age was 40 years. For every 100 females there were 92.9 males. For every 100 females age 18 and over, there were 83.7 males.

The median income for a household in the borough was $31,083, and the median income for a family was $36,250. Males had a median income of $27,283 versus $18,800 for females. The per capita income for the borough was $16,593. About 9.2% of families and 10.8% of the population were below the poverty line, including 15.7% of those under age 18 and 5.4% of those age 65 or over.

References

Populated places established in 1806
Boroughs in Clinton County, Pennsylvania